Siddharth Basrur is an Indian vocalist, composer and a playback singer. He entered the indie music scene with his first band, Kinky Ski Munky. He is the frontman of Mumbai's progressive metal band Goddess Gagged. Basrur has contributed to Bollywood movies like Haunted 3D, Players  and David.

Early life 
Siddharth Basrur was born in 1981 and was interested in music since childhood. Basrur dropped out of his first year of college and started working in a music store, as it paid him more than his pocket money. He grew up listening to everything from Alice Cooper to Kishore Kumar. He was influenced by his father and uncles, who listened to a lot of classic rock 'n’ roll. At the young age of 15, Alternative Rock became his favourite genre.

Career 
With a diploma in audio engineering, Basrur worked in the film industry doing audio post production for films. He quit his job as a sound engineer and took up content writing for Channel V in 2008, which he later quit in order to make music full-time. In 2000, Basrur composed vocal melodies for the band Kinky Ski Munky. Chirantan, a friend of Basrur who made music for Haunted 3D, gave Basrur his first break in commercial music when he sang two songs for the movie. In late 2016, he sang the Hindi version of the song "We Know the Way" for the Hindi-dubbed release of the Disney animated feature film Moana.

Performances and appearances 
He was asked to open the show for late Indian sitar legend Ravi Shankar's daughter, Norah Jones' performance at the 'A Summer's Day' music festival, held in Mumbai on 2 March 2013. Basrur and Meiyang Chang performed a jam session at the Jack&Jones store in Mumbai, on 20 October 2013. He has also performed live at IndiEarth at the Park, held in Chennai.

Music style and impact 
Basrur's music ranges between a variety of genres like punk rock and indie rock, to metal music. In 2013, he released his solo album Chasing Rain in two chapters – Chapter 1 and Chapter 2.

Awards and nominations 
Siddharth Basrur won the MTV VMAI in 2013, for Roots Song of the Year. He has been nominated for the Radio Cit Awards in 2013, and also for the Jack Daniels Rock awards in 2014 in the categories of song of the year and male artist of the year

Discography 
Bollywood

Sandalwood

Kollywood

IPL 2018

Solo Career

Goddess Gagged

References 

1981 births
Living people
Bollywood playback singers
Indian male playback singers
Indian male singer-songwriters
Indian singer-songwriters